Janice Seamon-Molson (born June 6, 1956) is an American bridge player.

Career
She has won major tournaments under the name Janice Seamon as well. As of 2016, Seamon–Molson ranked 3rd among women World Grand Masters by world masterpoints (MP) and 11th by placing points that do not decay over time.

Born to bridge players Rita and William Seamon, Janice Lee Seamon was the only girl of three children. Her youngest brother, Michael Seamon, was also a nationally ranked bridge player. She grew up around North Miami, Florida.

She attended University of Florida, University of Kansas City, and summa cum laude from Nova University School of Law.  
She passed the bar, earning her title as an attorney. As of November 2022, she has won 19 North American Championships, and has 19 seconds.  She has also won 4 world championships (Venice Cup 2003 and 2013; McConnell Cup 2006; World Bridge Games 2016), finished second 3 times (Venice Cup 2000 and 2013 Olympiad 2004), and been third 3 times (Women's Pairs 2006; Olympiad 2008; McConnell Cup 2014).

At the SportAccord World Mind Games in Beijing, in December 2011, Seamon-Molson won the "Individuals Women" gold medal by achieving the highest score in a series of rounds played with different and generally unfamiliar partners. Not a world championship meet, the SportAccord WMG invited 24 women from Great Britain, France, China, and the U.S. to compete in three small tournaments as four national teams, twelve pairs, and 24 individuals. The six U.S. women also won the team gold medal. Seamon-Molson's partner was Tobi Sokolow.  At the same event in 2012, Seamon-Molson won the team silver medal.

Personal life 
Janice married Mark Molson, a well known Canadian bridge player, on March 16, 1999. Mark Molson died suddenly of complications during an operation for a dissected aortic aneurism on January 19, 2006.

Seamon-Molson has a daughter, born September 5, 1998, named Jennifer Rose Molson. Jennifer attended New York Film Academy for musical theatre.

Bridge accomplishments

Wins
 World Championships (5)
 Venice Cup (2) 2003, 2013
 McConnell Cup (1) 2006
 World Bridge Games (1) 2016
 SportAccord World Mind Games Women's Team (1) 2011
 North American Bridge Championships (19)
 Rockwell Mixed Pairs (1) 2014 
 Machlin Women's Swiss Teams (3) 2002, 2009, 2011 
 Wagar Women's Knockout Teams (6) 1988, 1992, 2000, 2001, 2007, 2013,
 Sternberg Women's Board-a-Match Teams (4) 1999, 2003, 2011, 2014 
Whitehead Women's Pairs (1) 1992
Smith Life Master Women's Pairs (2) 1993, 1997
Mixed Swiss Teams (1) 2022

Runners-up
 World Championships (4)
 Venice Cup (1) 2000
 Womens Teams (2) 2004, 2015
 McConnell Cup (1) 2022
 North American Bridge Championships (19)
 Whitehead Women's Pairs (2) 1989, 2001 
 Smith Life Master Women's Pairs (3) 1991, 2006, 2008 
 Grand National Teams (1) 2022 
 Machlin Women's Swiss Teams (4) 1988, 1999, 2000, 2003 
 Wagar Women's Knockout Teams (6) 1989, 1993, 2002, 2003, 2006, 2012 
 Sternberg Women's Board-a-Match Teams (3) 2009, 2010, 2012

References

External links
 
 SEAMON MOLSON Janice athlete information at the 1st SportAccord World Mind Games (2011)

American contract bridge players
American lawyers
People from North Miami, Florida
University of Florida alumni
University of Missouri–Kansas City alumni
Nova Southeastern University alumni
Living people
Place of birth missing (living people)
1956 births